Thierry De Borchgrave (born 21 May 1932) is a Belgian bobsledder. He competed in the four-man event at the 1964 Winter Olympics.

References

1932 births
Living people
Belgian male bobsledders
Olympic bobsledders of Belgium
Bobsledders at the 1964 Winter Olympics
Place of birth missing (living people)